Events from the year 1859 in Russia

Incumbents
 Monarch – Alexander II

Events

 
 
  
  
 Iskra (magazine)
 Russian Musical Society
 Vilnius–Kaunas Railway

Births

Deaths

References

1859 in Russia
Years of the 19th century in the Russian Empire